was a single-member electoral district for the House of Representatives, the lower house of the National Diet of Japan. It was located in western Nagasaki and consisted of the cities of Sasebo, Hirado, Matsuura and Saikai, as well as Kitamatsuura District. As of 2021, 250,004 eligible voters were registered in the district.

List of Representatives

Area Covered 
The district was redrawn 2 times between its creation in 1994 and its abolition, once in 2013 and once again in 2017. The district was abolished during redistricting in 2022 and the areas it covered as of 2022 were transferred to the 3rd district.

Areas from 2017 - 2022 
After the 2017 revisions, the areas covered by the district are as follows:

 Sasebo (Excluding the Haiki, Mikawachi and Miya Branch Departments)
 Hirado, Nagasaki 
 Matsuura, Nagasaki
 Saikai, Nagasaki
 Kitamatsuura District
 Saza, Nagasaki
Due to the redrawing of the district borders, Ojika, Nagasaki was moved to the 3rd district, while Saikai was gained from the 2nd district

Areas from 2013 - 2017 
from the redistricting in 2013 until the redistricting in 2017, the areas covered by the district are as follows:
 Sasebo (Excluding the Haiki, Mikawachi and Miya Branch Departments)
 Hirado, Nagasaki 
 Matsuura, Nagasaki
 Kitamatsuura District

Areas from before 2013 
From its formation in 1994, until its first redistricting in 2013, the areas covered by this district were as follows:

 Sasebo
 Hirado
 Matsuura
 Kitamatsuura District

History

Election Results 

10

References

Related 

History of Nagasaki Prefecture
Districts of the House of Representatives (Japan)
Districts in Nagasaki Prefecture
Politics of Nagasaki Prefecture